Hospet Sumitra was the first Bishop in Rayalaseema of the Church of South India.

After graduating from the Central College of Bangalore, he studied theology at the United Theological College, Bengaluru between 1910 and 1913 and was among its first students and studied under L. P. Larsen, J. Mathers, F. Kingsbury, G. E. Phillips, W. H. Thorp, D. S. Herrick, and others.
He was Moderator of the Church of South India from 1954 to 1962.

Sumitra died on 19 January 1970 in Bellary, Karnataka.

Further reading
 
Notes

1888 births
1970 deaths
Anglican bishops of Rayalaseema
Telugu people
Kannada people
20th-century Anglican bishops in India
Senate of Serampore College (University) alumni
Church of South India clergy
Indian bishops
Moderators of the Church of South India